"I'd Rather Leave While I'm In Love" is a song co-written by Peter Allen and Carole Bayer Sager, popularized by Rita Coolidge in 1979, and recorded by a number of other artists.

Charts

Rita Coolidge recording
"I'd Rather Leave While I'm In Love" was a comeback single for Rita Coolidge in 1979.  Of her four previous singles between 1978 and 1979, two had not charted, while two had been in the top 20 on the adult contemporary charts, though not in the top 10. In contrast, the Coolidge version of the "I'd Rather Leave While I'm In Love" reached Number 3 on the U.S. adult contemporary chart, as well as charting highly elsewhere.  It has been described as one of Coolidge's "most triumphant performances", and was included on Coolidge's Satisfied album (A&M, 1979).

Chart performance

Popular culture
In the United Kingdom the song was used in a Public Information Film warning about the dangers of drink driving.

References

1979 songs
Rita Coolidge songs
A&M Records singles
Songs written by Peter Allen (musician)
Songs written by Carole Bayer Sager